Cha Dong-Hoon (born November 7, 1989) is a South Korean football player.

Club statistics

References

External links

1989 births
Living people
South Korean footballers
J2 League players
Japan Football League players
FC Gifu players
FC Kariya players
Association football forwards